The film roles of American actor and comedian Steve Martin include The Jerk (1979), The Man with Two Brains (1983), All of Me (1984), Three Amigos (1986), Roxanne (1987), Planes, Trains and Automobiles (1987), Parenthood (1989), Father of the Bride (1991), Cheaper by the Dozen (2003), and The Pink Panther (2006). Martin has also hosted Saturday Night Live 16 times.

Film

Television

Theatre

See also
List of awards and nominations received by Steve Martin

References

External links

Martin, Steve
Martin, Steve
Filmography